The 2013–14 season was Fleetwood Town's second-consecutive season in Football League Two.

League Two Data

League table

Result Summary

Result by round

Kit

|

Squad

Statistics

|}

Goalscorers

Disciplinary record

Contracts

Transfers

In

Loan In

Out

Loans out

Fixtures and results

Pre-season

League Two

Football League Cup

FA Cup

Johnstone's Paint Trophy

Overall summary

Summary

Score overview

References 

2013-14
2013–14 Football League Two by team